The year 609 BC was a year of the pre-Julian Roman calendar. In the Roman Empire, it was known as year 145 Ab urbe condita . The denomination 609 BC for this year has been used since the early medieval period, when the Anno Domini calendar era became the prevalent method in Europe for naming years.

Events
 The Medes and the Babylonians defeat the Assyrians under Ashur-uballit II and capture Harran. Ashur-uballit II, the last king of Assyria, disappears from history.
 Battle of Megiddo—King Josiah is killed fighting against Necho II, who was on his way to aid the Assyrian state.
 King Jehoahaz succeeds his father Josiah as king of Judah, though he is killed by Necho II, who instead installs Jehoahaz's brother Jehoiakim.
The Persian Gulf recedes by a large portion, extending the Tigris and Euphrates rivers by 187mi (300km).

Births

Deaths
 Ashur-uballit II (probably), last king of Assyria
 Josiah, king of Judah
 Jehoahaz, king of Judah
 Duke Kang of Qin, ruler of the state of Qin
 Duke Yi of Qi, ruler of the state of Qi

References